Hednota diacentra is a moth in the family Crambidae. It was described by Edward Meyrick in 1897. It is found in Australia, where it has been recorded from Victoria.

References

Crambinae
Moths described in 1897